The Nice Carnival is one of the world's major carnival events, alongside the Brazilian Carnival, Venetian Carnival, and Mardi Gras in New Orleans. It is held annually in February and sometimes early March (depending on the movable date of Carnival in the Christian calendar) in Nice on the French Riviera.

History
The earliest records establish the carnival's existence in 1294, when the Count of Provence, Charles Anjou, wrote that he had passed "the joyous days of carnival." This may make the Nice Carnival the original carnival celebration.

In 1873, a committee was created for the Carnival, headed by local artist , with later contributions from his son Gustav-Adolf Mossa.  The Carnival was reinvented into a parade, adding masquerades, satirical floats, and competitions.

Today, the two-week event attracts over a million visitors to Nice every year.

Each year, a special theme is chosen, and artists create 18 floats and other figurines in traditional papier-mâché for the colorful parade. The parades take place day and night, while on the Promenade des Anglais, "flower battles" occur.

In 2017, the memorial to the 2016 Nice truck attack was dismantled in preparation for the carnival. Additionally, the route was moved from the Promenade des Anglais to the Promenade du Paillon.

Gallery

References

External links

 

Culture of Nice
Tourist attractions in Nice
Festivals in France
Nice
Festivals established in 1294
Winter events in France